Fardabad (also Romanized as Fardābād; also known as Pardābād) is a village in Jaru Rural District, Palangabad District, Eshtehard County, Alborz Province, Iran. At the 2006 census, its population was 239, in 60 families.

References 

Populated places in Eshtehard County